The Peruc–Korycany Formation is a geologic unit of Upper Cretaceous age, located mostly in the Czech Republic. It is the oldest unit of the Bohemian Cretaceous Basin, which overlies Silurian-aged metamorphosed rocks of the Bohemian Massif. It consists of fluvial to shallow marine sediments.

Fossil content

Dinosaurs
Dinosaur fossil remains about 94 million years old (Cenomanian stage) were found in 2003 near the village Mezholezy (Miskovice), by Kutná Hora. This small basal ornithopod dinosaur was officially named Burianosaurus augustai in 2017.

Invertebrates

Plants

References

Geologic formations of the Czech Republic
Upper Cretaceous Series of Europe
Cenomanian Stage
Paleontology in the Czech Republic